Mangelia isabellae is a minute extinct species of sea snail, a marine gastropod mollusk in the family Mangeliidae.

Description
The length of the shell attains 11 mm.

Distribution
This extinct marine species was found in Miocene strata of the Alum Bluff Formation, Florida, USA

References

External links
 Worldwide Mollusc Species Data Base: Mangelia isabellae

isabellae
Gastropods described in 1910